Maha Thammaracha III, born as Sai Lue Thai, was a king of the Sukhothai Kingdom.

Ancestry

See also
Sukhothai kingdom

Kings of Sukhothai
Year of birth missing
1419 deaths
Thai princes
15th-century Thai people